The Green Point Lighthouse  is a provincial heritage site in Clansthal in the KwaZulu-Natal province of South Africa.

In 1995 it was described in the Government Gazette as an "unusual cast-iron structure, erected in 1905, [...] the oldest lighthouse on the KwaZulu-Natal coast."

Senior lightkeepers

See also

 List of lighthouses in South Africa

References

External links
 Picture of Green Point Lighthouse, KwaZulu-Natal

Lighthouses completed in 1905
Lighthouses in South Africa
Buildings and structures in KwaZulu-Natal
1905 establishments in the Colony of Natal